Antoine Veil (28 August 1926 – 11 April 2013) was a French civil servant of the haut fonctionnaire grade.

Veil was born on 28 August 1926 in Blâmont Commune, Meurthe-et-Moselle Department.

Veil died on 11 April 2013.

On 5 July 2017, President of France Emmanuel Macron announced that the remains of Antoine Veil and his wife Simone Veil would be transferred to the Panthéon.

References

1926 births
2013 deaths
20th-century French civil servants
Sciences Po alumni
École nationale d'administration alumni
Inspection générale des finances (France)
Grand Officiers of the Légion d'honneur
Commanders Crosses of the Order of Merit of the Federal Republic of Germany
Burials at the Panthéon, Paris